The  is a river in the Hokuriku region of Honshu, Japan. It is also called the Aga River or the Ōkawa River  in Fukushima.

The source of the river is Mount Arakai on the border of Fukushima and Tochigi. It flows to the north and meets the Nippashi River from Lake Inawashiro and the Tadami River in the Aizu Basin, and then turns to the west and falls into the Sea of Japan. The Agano River flows for 210 kilometers. It has a watershed area of 7,710 square kilometers.

In 1964–1965, a chemical factory at Kanose village in Niigata Prefecture released methylmercury into the river and caused Niigata Minamata disease.

There are several hydroelectric power plants on the Agano River:
 Inawashiro Power Plant (107.5 MW), constructed several steps in 1899–1940. It was the site of the Japan first high-voltage, long-range power transmission line.
 Numazawanuma Power Plant (43.7 MW), constructed in 1952. It was the first pumped-storage power plant in Japan.

References

External links

Rivers of Niigata Prefecture
Rivers of Fukushima Prefecture
Rivers of Japan